On 10 November 2008, Ryanair Flight 4102 from Frankfurt–Hahn Airport, in Hahn, Rhineland-Palatinate to Ciampino–G. B. Pastine International Airport, in Rome, Italy, suffered multiple bird strikes while landing. Of the 172 people on board, two crew and eight passengers received hospital treatment for minor injuries. The 8-month-old Boeing 737-8AS jet used for the flight (registered as EI-DYG) had received a massive amount of damage, which led to it being written off. This accident represents the fourth hull loss of a Boeing 737-800.

Accident
Flight 4102 was commanded by 44-year-old Belgian pilot Frédéric Colson with 10,000 flight hours, of which 6,000 were on the Boeing 737, and his co pilot First Officer Alexander Vet — a Dutch citizen aged 23 with 600 flight hours with 400 being on the 737.
The jet struck up to 90 starlings on final approach to Rome Ciampino Airport which damaged the port (left) side landing gear and both engines. The flight attempted to execute a missed approach after one engine was damaged, but the remaining engine ingested birds as well and was damaged during this maneuver. It was reported that the aircraft left runway 15 for a short time before the flight crew brought it back onto the runway.

The final report of the accident, investigated by the National Agency for the Safety of Flight (ANSV) was released on 20 December 2018, more than 10 years after the accident.

Aftermath
The airport was closed for 36 hours and all traffic was diverted to Leonardo da Vinci–Fiumicino Airport due to the jet being stranded on the runway after the port side landing gear collapsed.

This accident caused such substantial damage that the aircraft was written off. Ryanair retained ownership of it for certain parts and for training purposes.

See also 

 US Airways Flight 1549 – a similar aviation-related air accident that occurred 2 months later in New York City, involving an Airbus A320.
Kalitta Air Flight 207 – another flight accompanied by a bird strike 5 months earlier.

References

External links
 

Aviation accidents and incidents in Italy
Aviation accidents and incidents in 2008
Airliner accidents and incidents caused by bird strikes
Accidents and incidents involving the Boeing 737 Next Generation
November 2008 events in Europe
4102